Cardiocraniinae is a subfamily of rodents in the family Dipodidae, named by the Russian zoologist Boris Stepanovich Vinogradov (1891–1958) in 1925. These jumping rodents are small mammals, less than 20 cm long.

Taxonomy 
Genus Cardiocranius
Five-toed pygmy jerboa, Cardiocranius paradoxus
Genus Salpingotulus
Baluchistan pygmy jerboa, Salpingotulus michaelis
Genus Salpingotus, pygmy jerboas
Subgenus Anguistodontus
Thick-tailed pygmy jerboa, Salpingotus crassicauda
Subgenus Prosalpingotus
Heptner's pygmy jerboa, Salpingotus heptneri
Pale pygmy jerboa, Salpingotus pallidus
Thomas's pygmy jerboa, Salpingotus thomasi
Subgenus Salpingotus
 Kozlov's pygmy jerboa, Salpingotus kozlovi

References

External links 

Dipodidae
Mammal subfamilies